Goodrich is a town in Taylor County, Wisconsin, United States. The population was 510 at the 2010 census.

History
The south and east edges of the six by six mile square that would become Goodrich were first surveyed in 1851 by crews working for the U.S. government. In December 1861 a different crew of surveyors marked all the section corners in the township, walking through the woods and swamps, measuring with chain and compass. When done, the deputy surveyor filed this general description:
The surface of this Township is mostly gently rolling and the Soil is principally 2nd Rate being well adapted to agricultural purposes. The Timber is a mixture of Hemlock Birch Sugar (?) Fir and Maple. There is but little Swamp land in the Township but it is well watered by numerous small streams of pure water which are tributaries of the Rib River which (?) through the Township in a South Easterly direction. It is a Stream that does not overflow having but few tributaries(?) to affect its rise and fall. There are no settlers in this Township.

The dells of the Big Rib River in Goodrich are probably the rapids where Father René Menard disappeared in 1661, while attempting to reach a band of Huron Indians at Lake Chelsea. He left his partner at the rapids to carry some supplies and was never seen again.

Geography
According to the United States Census Bureau, the town has a total area of 36.3 square miles (94.0 km2), all of it land.

Demographics
As of the census of 2010, there were 510 people, 188 households, and 144 families residing in the town. The population density was 14.0 people per square mile (5.4/km2). There were 243 housing units at an average density of 6.7 per square mile (2.6/km2). The racial makeup of the town was 99.80% White, and 0.20% from two or more races. Hispanic or Latino of any race were 0.20% of the population

There were 188 households, out of which 31.4% had children under the age of 18 living with them, 66.5% were married couples living together, 4.8% had a female householder with no husband present, and 23.4% were non-families. 20.2% of all households were made up of individuals, and 22.9% had someone living alone who was 65 years of age or older. The average household size was 2.71 and the average family size was 3.11.

In the town, the population was spread out, with 24.5% under the age of 18, 7.25% from 18 to 24, 23.5% from 25 to 44, 33.1% from 45 to 64, and 11.6% who were 65 years of age or older. The median age was 40.6 years. For every 1 female there were 1.29 males. For every 1 female age 18 and over, there were 1.06 males.

As of the census of 2000, The median income for a household in the town was $42,500, and the median income for a family was $45,000. Males had a median income of $27,788 versus $20,278 for females. The per capita income for the town was $16,724. About 8.8% of families and 10.3% of the population were below the poverty line, including 11.6% of those under age 18 and 18.7% of those age 65 or over.

Religion 
The Town of Goodrich has two churches, Goodrich Community Church and St. Andrew's Lutheran Church.

See also
 List of towns in Wisconsin

References

External links

Towns in Taylor County, Wisconsin
Towns in Wisconsin